The World Association of Detectives (W.A.D.) was founded in 1925. It is the International Association for Private Investigators and Security Service Organizations. The World Association of Detectives was formed as a joint venture by the combined membership of the World Association of Detectives and the International Secret Service Association. It is the oldest international association in its field. In 1972 it had 400 members in 34 countries, growing to over 700 in about 60 countries in 1997. In 2020 it had nearly 1,000 members in over 80 countries.

References

External links
Official website

 
Organizations established in 1925